Eric Lamoine Wilkins (born December 9, 1956) is a former Major League Baseball pitcher who played for one season. He pitched for the Cleveland Indians for 16 games during the 1979 Cleveland Indians season.

Wilkins attended Washington State University, where he played college baseball for the Cougars from 1975–1977.

References

External links

1956 births
Living people
Major League Baseball pitchers
Cleveland Indians players
Charleston Charlies players
Baseball players from Missouri
Baseball players from Seattle
Washington State Cougars baseball players
Garfield High School (Seattle) alumni
Alaska Goldpanners of Fairbanks players
Chattanooga Lookouts players
Portland Beavers players
Tacoma Tigers players
Waterloo Indians players